The following is a list of the India national football team's competitive records and statistics.

The India national football team represents India in international football and is controlled by the All India Football Federation. Under the global jurisdiction of FIFA and governed in Asia by the AFC, the team is also part of the South Asian Football Federation. The team, which was once considered one of the best teams in Asia, had its golden era during the 1950s and early 1960s. During this period, under the coaching of Syed Abdul Rahim, India won gold during the 1951 and 1962 Asian Games,won Silver medal in 1964 AFC Asia Cup as runners up,while finishing fourth during the 1956 Summer Olympics.
India has never participated in the FIFA World Cup, although the team did qualify by default for the 1950 World Cup after all the other nations in their qualification group withdrew. However India withdrew prior to the beginning of the tournament.

India has never participated in a FIFA World Cup. After gaining independence in 1947, India managed to qualify for the World Cup held in 1950. This was due to Myanmar, Indonesia, and the Philippines withdrawing from qualification. However, prior to the start of the tournament, India themselves withdrew due to the expenses required in getting the team to Brazil. Other reasons cited for why India withdrew include FIFA not allowing Indian players to play in the tournament barefoot and the All India Football Federation not considering the World Cup an important tournament compared to the Olympics.

After withdrawing from the 1950 FIFA World Cup, India didn't enter the qualifying rounds of the tournament between 1954 and 1982. Since the 1986 qualifiers, with the exception of the 1990 edition of the tournament, the team started to participate in qualifiers but have yet to qualify for the tournament again.

Individual records

Player records 

Players in bold are still active with India.

Manager records

Competition records

FIFA World Cup 
India has never played in finals of a FIFA World Cup. The closest they came to qualify was back in 2002 when they were a point away from progressing in to the final round.

AFC Asian Cup

Summer Olympics

Asian Games

AFC Challenge Cup

SAFF Championship

South Asian Games

Other tournaments 
 Colombo Cup
  Champions: 1952, 1953, 1954, 1955

 Merdeka Tournament
  Runners-up: 1959, 1964
  Third place: 1965, 1966, 1970

 Pesta Sukan Cup
  Champions: 1971

 King's Cup
  Third place: 1977, 2019

 Nehru Cup
  Champions: 2007, 2009, 2012

 Intercontinental Cup
  Champions: 2017, 2018

 VFF Cup
  Runners-up: 2022

Head-to-head record

The results only include matches considered as FIFA A matches. Other matches played against Club teams, Underage sides or Olympic teams are not included here. Updated as of 27 September 2022 (vs Vietnam).

Notes:

Honours

See also
 India national football team
 India national football team results

References

Notes

Association football in India lists
India national football team
Football in India
National association football team records and statistics